Perumudivakkam is a small village on the outskirts of Chennai, and a developing residential area in North Chennai, a metropolitan city in Tamil Nadu, India. It is Located Northwest Chennai in Tiruvallur District near to the proposed Smart City Ponneri. It is 29 km from the Chennai Koyambedu terminus and 10 km from Red Hills Bus Terminus.  

Perumudivakkam  has a temple for Sri KothandaRama and the temple is connected with Ramayana.

Sri kaiveachu Parvathi parameshwar temple 
the 100 year old Sri kaiveachu Parvathi parameshwar temple is also located in the village.

References

Villages in Tiruvallur district